Marianne Sägebrecht (born 27 August 1945) is a German film actress.

Her background included stints as a medical lab assistant and magazine assistant editor before she found her calling in show business. Claiming to be inspired by Bavaria's mad King Ludwig II, she became known as the "mother of Munich's subculture" as producer and performer of avant-garde theater and cabaret revues, particularly with her troupe Opera Curiosa. Spotted by director Percy Adlon in a 1977 production of Adele Spitzeder in which she essayed the role of a delicate prostitute, Sägebrecht was cast as Madame Sanchez/Mrs. Sancho Panza in Adlon's TV special Herr Kischott (1979), a spin on Don Quixote. The director put her in his 1983 feature The Swing in a small role and then in the leading role of Marianne, an overweight mortician in love with a subway conductor, in Sugarbaby (1985).

In 1987 she co-starred in the romantic comedy Bagdad Café.  American films beckoned as well and Sägebrecht was often cast in roles tailored to her unique abilities. Paul Mazursky reworked the part of a Teutonic masseuse for her in Moon over Parador (1988) while Danny DeVito tailored the part of the German housekeeper for a divorcing couple in The War of the Roses (1989).

Returning to Germany, she played a timid maid in the 1930s who marries her Jewish employer for convenience then falls in love in Martha and I (1990; released in the USA in 1995). Sägebrecht headlined the black comedy as an unhappy wife whose straying husband plots her death in Mona Must Die (1994) and had small supporting parts in The Ogre (1996) and Left Luggage (1998).

In 1997, she was a member of the jury at the 47th Berlin International Film Festival.

Filmography

  (1983) - Tandlerin
 Ein irres Feeling (1984) - Alfa's Mother
 Im Himmel ist die Hölle los (1984) - Journalist*
 Sugarbaby (a.k.a. Zuckerbaby) (1985) - lead role of Marianne
 Bagdad Café (a.k.a. Out of Rosenheim) (1987) - lead role of Jasmin
 Crazy Boys (1987) - Frl. Hermann
 Moon Over Parador (1988) - Magda
 The War of the Roses (1989) - Susan
 Rosalie Goes Shopping (1989) - lead role of Rosalie Greenspace
 Martha and I (1991) - Martha
 La Vida láctea (1992) - Aloha
 Dust Devil (1992) - Dr. Leidzinger
  (1993) - Emma
 Erotique (1994) - Hilde (segment "Taboo Parlor")
 Mona Must Die (1994) - Mona von Snead
 Eine Mutter kämpft um ihren Sohn (1994) - Marion Bruckmüller
 All Men are Mortal (1995) - Annie
 Beauville (1995)
 Luise and the Jackpot (1995) - Luise
 The Ogre (1996) - Mrs. Netta
  (1997) - Tata Jeannette
 Lorenz im Land der Lügner (1997) - Tante Martha
 Johnny (1997)
 Spanish Fly (1998) - Rosa
 Left Luggage (1998) - Chaya's Mother
  (1999) - Elli Schulze
 Asterix and Obelix vs Caesar (1999) - Bonnemine (Gutemine)
 Private Lies (2001) - Betty
 Großglocknerliebe (2003) - Anneliese
 Marga Engel kocht vor Wut (2003) - Marga Engel
 Marga Engel gibt nicht auf (2004) - Marga Engel
 Charlotte und ihre Männer (2005) - Charlotte
 Bezaubernde Marie (2007) - Marie Meyer
 Das Geheimnis meiner Schwester (2007) - Antonia Wiedemann
 Immer Wirbel um Marie (2008) - Marie Meyer
 In aller Freundschaft (2008) - Helga Schulze
 Frau Holle (2008) - Frau Holle
  (2012) - Marguerita
 Pettson & Findus: Fun Stuff (2014) - Beda
 The Circle (2014) - Erika

References

External links

 
 Web.archive.org

1945 births
Living people
German film actresses
German television actresses
People from Starnberg
Best Actress German Film Award winners
20th-century German actresses
21st-century German actresses